The III Constitutional Government was the third Constitutional Government (administration or cabinet) under the Constitution of East Timor.  Formed on 19 May 2007, it was led by the country's fourth Prime Minister, Estanislau da Silva, and was replaced by the IV Constitutional Government on 8 August 2007.

Composition
The government was made up of Ministers, Vice Ministers and Secretaries of State, as follows:

Ministers

Vice Ministers

Secretaries of State

References

Cabinets established in 2007
Cabinets disestablished in 2007
Constitutional Governments of East Timor
2007 establishments in East Timor
2007 disestablishments in East Timor